Landau is a surname. A variation of Landau is Landauer. Notable people with the surname include:

 Barry Landau, American collector alleged to have stolen thousands of historical documents
 Bina Landau (1925–1988), Polish-born American Jewish soprano
 Chaim Landau (1916–1981), Israeli Minister of Transportation
 Christopher Landau (born 1963), American lawyer and diplomat; former U.S. Ambassador to Mexico
 David J. Landau (1920–1996), author and Holocaust survivor
 David Landau (screenwriter), American screenwriter
 David Landau (journalist), former editor-in-chief of Israeli daily newspaper Haaretz
 David Landau (actor), American actor 
 David P. Landau, American physicist
 Dov Landau (born 1930), Israeli rabbi
 Edmund Landau (1877–1938), German mathematician
 Edie Landau, American television producer
 Ely Landau, American television producer
 Eugen Landau (1852–1935), German banker and philanthropist
 Felix Landau (1910–1983), Austrian National Socialist, SS Hauptscharführer, served in an Einsatzkommando
 Felix Landau (art dealer) (1924–2003), American art dealer
Gili Landau (born 1958), Israeli footballer and manager
 Guttman Landau, Bessarabian Judenrat leader
 Henry Landau, American mathematician
 Henry Landau (captain), British World War I Captain and author
 Jacob Landau (artist), American artist
 Jacob Landau, American journalist
 Jacob ben Judah Landau, rabbi
 Joel Landau, rabbi
 John A. Landau, member of the Rhodesian parliament
 Jon Landau, American music critic and record producer
 Jon Landau (film producer), American film producer
 Judah Leo Landau, rabbi
 Juliet Landau, American actress
 Jules Landau, British musician and writer
 Kurt Landau, Austrian communist
 Lev Landau, Soviet physicist, awarded the Nobel Prize in 1962
 Martin Landau, American actor
 Michael Landau, American session guitarist
 Moshe Landau, Israeli jurist, former president of the Supreme Court of Israel, president of the court during the Adolf Eichmann war crimes trial
 Neil Landau, American writer, playwright, producer, director
 Russ Landau, American musician
 Salo Landau, Dutch chess player
 Saul Landau (1936–2013), American author, documentary filmmaker, and academic
 Saul Raphael Landau, lawyer and Zionist activist
 Seth Landau, American film maker
 Siegfried Landau, founder of the Brooklyn Philharmonic
 Susan Landau, American mathematician and engineer
 Suzanne Landau (born 1946), Israeli art museum curator
 Uzi Landau (born 1943), Israeli politician
 William Landau (1924–2017), American neurologist
 Yechezkel Landau (1713–1793), Jewish theologian and decisor

Fictional characters 
 Burt Landau, fictional character on "FX"
 Dov Landau, fictional character in the novel and film Exodus
 Nathan Landau, fictional character in the film "Sophie's Choice"

See also 
 Landau (disambiguation)
 Landau Eugene Murphy Jr. (born 1974)

German-language surnames
Jewish surnames